Juozas Dringelis (25 June 1935 – 4 June 2015) was a Lithuanian politician, born in Pabaronė. In 1990 he was among those who signed the Act of the Re-Establishment of the State of Lithuania.

References
 Biography

1935 births
2015 deaths
People from Varėna District Municipality
People from Wilno Voivodeship (1926–1939)
Members of the Seimas
Communist Party of the Soviet Union members
Signatories of the Act of the Re-Establishment of the State of Lithuania